Lucas Lovat (born 15 January 1997) is a Brazilian footballer who plays for Slovan Bratislava as a left back.

Club career

Spartak Trnava
Lovat made his professional Fortuna Liga debut for Spartak Trnava against DAC Dunajská Streda on 23 February 2019.

Honours 
Spartak Trnava
Slovnaft Cup: 2018–19

Slovan Bratislava
Fortuna Liga: 2019–20, 2020–21, 2021–22
Slovnaft Cup: 2019–20, 2020–21

References

External links
 FC Spartak Trnava official club profile
 
 
 Futbalnet profile

1997 births
Living people
Sportspeople from Florianópolis
Brazilian footballers
Brazilian expatriate footballers
Association football defenders
Avaí FC players
Grêmio Foot-Ball Porto Alegrense players
FC Spartak Trnava players
ŠK Slovan Bratislava players
Slovak Super Liga players
Expatriate footballers in Slovakia
Brazilian expatriate sportspeople in Slovakia